Osman is the Persian transliteration and derived from the Arabic masculine given name Uthman ( ‘uthmān) or an English surname. It may refer to:

People
 Osman (name), people with the name
 Osman I (1258–1326), founder of the Ottoman Empire
 Osman II (1604–1622), Ottoman sultan
 Osman III (1699–1757), Ottoman sultan
 Osman I of the Maldives, the Sultan of the Maldives in 1377
 Osman II of the Maldives, the Sultan of Maldives from 1420 to 1421
 Mir Osman Ali Khan, 7th and last Nizam (ruler) of Hyderabad

Places
 Osmanabad, a district of Maharashtra, India
 Osmannagar (alternative name for Sultanabad, Karimnagar), village located in Karimnagar district, Andhra Pradesh, India
 Osman, Iran, a village in Kermanshah Province, Iran
 Osman, Kurdistan, a village in Kurdistan Province, Iran
 Osman, Wisconsin, United States

Fish
 False osman (Schizopygopsis stoliczkai)
 Naked osman (Gymnodiptychus dybowskii)
 Scaly osman (Diptychus maculatus)
 Several species in the genus Oreoleuciscus

Other uses
 Osman (crater), a lunar crater
 Osman (video game), an arcade game by Mitchell Corporation
 House of Osman, an Ottoman dynasty
 A fictional merchant in the role-playing game Skies of Arcadia

See also

 Osmania (disambiguation)
 Osmania University, university in Hyderabad, India, named after founder Mir Osman Ali Khan
 Osmin, the name of a Turkish character in Mozart's operas Zaide and Die Entführung aus dem Serail
 Osmond (disambiguation)
 Usman (disambiguation)